Kanchana  is a 1952 Indian  drama film produced and directed by S. M. Sriramulu Naidu. The story is based on a popular Tamil novel, Kanchanayin Kanavu, authored by Lakshmi. It was filmed simultaneously in Tamil, Telugu and Malayalam languages.

Plot 
Pushpanathan is Zamindar of Mathur and his widowed mother is Ponnammal. He is persuaded by his college mate Manohar to start a textile mill. Manohar manages to manipulate and divert Pushpanathan's wealth. He introduces Pushpanathan to a dancer in the city, Bhanumathi. Bhanumathi, though the daughter of a prostitute, leads an honorable life. Bhanumathi is in love with Pushpanathan.

Neelamegham Pillai, the former accountant of the Zamindari, now lives in utter poverty. His grandchildren are Kanchana and Sabeshan. Pushpanathan comes to help his family. He becomes enamoured by Kanchana and weds her. He assures Bhanumathi that his marriage will not affect his love for her. Kanchana is ill-treated by her mother-in-law. She is heartbroken when she discovers her husband's relationship with Bhanumathi. The financial crisis caused by the construction of the textile mill and domestic worries disturbs Pushpanathan's peace of mind.

Seetha, a young lady doctor comes to Mathur. Pushpanathan is drawn to her. But Seetha is in love with her college mate doctor Sabeshan. Kanchana burns with suspicion and jealousy. Seetha leaves Mathur to avoid Pushpanathan, who vents his anger on his wife. Kanchana leaves home and Pushpanathan does not allow Kanchana to take her son. Ponnammal gradually begins to realize the value of Kanchana. She and Bhanumati ask Pushpanathan to bring Kanchana back home. Bhanumathi dies and transfers all her wealth to Kanchana's son. The story ends with Sabeshan wedding Seetha and Pushpanathan bringing Kanchana back home.

Cast 

Male cast
 K. R. Ramasamy as Pushpanathan
 T. S. Dorairaj as Kondaiah
 M. N. Nambiar as Manohar
 V. Ramasharma as Doctor Prasad
 K. Duraswami as Ramadasu
 N. S. Narayana Pillai as Lawyer
 K. S. Kannaiah
 P. A. Thomas as Sabeshan

Female cast
 Lalitha as Kanchana
 Padmini as Bhanumathi
 Miss Kumari as Doctor Seetha
 M. Rushyendramani as Parvathi Bai
 M. R. Santhanalakshmi as Gangarathnam
 K. N. Kamalam as Bangaramma
 Thankam as Rita
 Kannamma as Sarasu
 Thankamma
 Aranmula Ponnamma as Ponnamma

Production 
Kanchana was the screen version of a popular Tamil novel Kanchanayin Kanavu, authored by Tripurasundari, popularly known by her pen name "Lakshmi". The novel serially published in the Tamil weekly Ananda Vikatan, got widespread acceptance and appreciation from the readers for the morals it conveyed. The popularity of the novel prompted Sreeramulu Naidu to produce the film based on this story. Lakshmi said while her novel was serialised in Ananda Vikatan, readers asked her whether she had actresses Lalitha and Padmini in her mind when writing the novel. Therefore, she said that when Sri Ramulu Naidu bought the rights to make the novel into a film, she requested him to cast Lalitha and Padmini in the roles.

Soundtrack 
There are two kritis composed by Muthuswami Dikshitar and sung by M. L. Vasanthakumari included in the film. The raga that is called Tharangini in Muthuswami Dikshitar school, is otherwise known as Charukesi. Music was composed by S. M. Subbaiah Naidu, while the lyrics were penned by Papanasam Sivan, V. A. Gopalakrishnan and Namakkal R. Balasubramaniam.

Reception 
Although the performances of Ramasami, Lalitha, Padmini and Duraiswami were praised, according to Randor Guy, Kanchana was not commercially successful in either of its versions.

References

External links

Bibliography 

1950s Malayalam-language films
1950s multilingual films
1950s Tamil-language films
1950s Telugu-language films
1952 drama films
1952 films
Films based on Indian novels
Films directed by S. M. Sriramulu Naidu
Indian black-and-white films
Indian drama films
Films scored by S. M. Subbaiah Naidu
Films scored by Muthuswami Dikshitar
Indian multilingual films